

Results 
Legend
DNF — Did not finish
LAP — Lapped

The men's triathlon was part of the Triathlon at the 2015 European Games program, was held in Bilgah Beach Triathlon Venue on June 14, 2015.

The race was held over the "international distance" and consisted of  swimming,  road bicycle racing, and  road running.

Schedule
All times are Azerbaijan Standard Time (UTC+04:00)

Result

References 

Triathlon at the 2015 European Games